Garf or Garff may refer to:

 Robert H. Garff (1942–2020), American businessman and politician
 Salomon Garf (1879–1943), Dutch painter and graphic artist
 Vilhelm Garf (18851938), Russian and Soviet military officer
 Garff, one of the six sheadings of the Isle of Man
 GARF, State Archive of the Russian Federation
 an encoder of Vorbis, a free and open-source software project